Michelle Madhok (born May 26, 1971) is the Founder and CEO of White Cat Media Inc. - DBA SheFinds Media, parent company of online shopping publication SheFinds.com and MomFinds.com.  She writes a weekly style column for New York's Metro newspaper and appears regularly on Fox News Channel, The Today Show and The Tyra Banks Show. Michelle is a frequent speaker at internet, affiliate marketing and blogging industry conferences. She has written about dating tips for single celebrities at Yahoo Personals.

Prior to founding the clickbait website SheFinds.com, Madhok served as group director of editorial products for women at AOL.

She was educated at University of California, Berkeley, achieving a BS in Communications and an MS  in Marketing from Northwestern University.

On September 10, 2005 Michelle married entrepreneur and internet maven Michael Palka whom she met via Match.com. They live on the west side of Manhattan.

References

American women chief executives
University of California, Berkeley alumni
American bloggers
Living people
1971 births
Businesspeople from California
American women bloggers
American chief executives in the media industry
Kellogg School of Management alumni
21st-century American women
21st-century American businesspeople